The Herald of Randolph is a weekly newspaper published in Randolph, Vermont covering sixteen communities in Vermont's Upper Valley region. Circulation was 5500 in 2015.

History 
The Herald was established in 1874 by L.P. Thayer after purchasing the Green Mountain Herald, also published in Randolph. After an 1877 fire, the newspaper consolidated with the Chelsea Post, the Vermont News from Bethel, Vermont, and the Green Mountain Herald and was called The Herald and News. It was published in two editions, a four-page paper with only local news, and a slightly more expensive eight-page paper with "all the news." The newspaper had separate editions for the towns of Chelsea, Bethel and added editions for Rochester and South Royalton in 1894.

This newspaper was purchased by L.B. Johnson in 1894. The paper's current offices were built in 1899. In 1941 Johnson changed the name to The White River Valley Herald. Ownership of the paper passed to John Drysdale, who was publisher until 1971. In 1960 The Herald became the first newspaper in Vermont to use offset printing. The paper was published in house until 1994. Drysdale's son M. D. Drysdale took over the newspaper in 1971 and changed the name to The Herald of Randolph. Tim Calabro and his wife Katie Vincent-Roller, became the Herald's owners in June 2015 via the company Black White Red, LLC, which does business as The Herald of Randolph.  Calabro had started at the paper as a photographer while he was still in high school.

Awards 
The Herald won first place from the Vermont Press Association in 2013 for coverage of Hurricane Irene and its effect on the Upper Valley.

The New England Newspaper and Press Association said “The Herald is known as one of the best weeklies in New England and beyond” when they inducted M. D. Drysdale into their Hall of Fame.

Online presence 
The Herald has had a website since June 2000 where some content is behind a paywall. The paper also has a presence on Facebook and Instagram.

References

External links
Official website 

Randolph, Vermont
Newspapers published in Vermont
1874 establishments in Vermont
Publications established in 1874
Weekly newspapers published in the United States